The spherical Bernstein's problem is a possible generalization of the original Bernstein's problem in the field of global differential geometry, first proposed by Shiing-Shen Chern in 1969, and then later in 1970, during his plenary address at the International Congress of Mathematicians in Nice.

The problem
Are the equators in  the only smooth embedded minimal hypersurfaces which are topological -dimensional spheres?

Additionally, the spherical Bernstein's problem, while itself a generalization of the original Bernstein's problem, can, too, be generalized further by replacing the ambient space  by a simply-connected, compact symmetric space. Some results in this direction are due to Wu-Chung Hsiang and Wu-Yi Hsiang work.

Alternative formulations
Below are two alternative ways to express the problem:

The second formulation
Let the (n − 1) sphere be embedded as a minimal hypersurface in (1). Is it necessarily an equator?

By the Almgren–Calabi theorem, it's true when n = 3 (or n = 2 for the 1st formulation).

Wu-Chung Hsiang proved it for n ∈  {4, 5, 6, 7, 8, 10, 12, 14} (or n ∈ {3, 4, 5, 6, 7, 9, 11, 13}, respectively)

In 1987, Per Tomter proved it for all even n (or all odd n, respectively).

Thus, it only remains unknown for all odd n ≥ 9 (or all even n ≥ 8, respectively)

The third formulation
Is it true that an embedded, minimal hypersphere inside the Euclidean -sphere is
necessarily an equator?

Geometrically, the problem is analogous to the following problem:

Is the local topology at an isolated singular point of a minimal hypersurface necessarily different from that of a disc?

For example, the affirmative answer for spherical Bernstein problem when n = 3 is equivalent to the fact that the local topology at an isolated singular point of any minimal hypersurface in an arbitrary Riemannian 4-manifold must be different from that of a disc.

Further reading
F.J. Almgren, Jr., Some interior regularity theorems for minimal surfaces and an extension of the Bernstein's theorem, Annals of Mathematics, volume 85, number 1 (1966), pp. 277–292
E. Calabi, Minimal immersions of surfaces in euclidean spaces, Journal of Differential Geometry, volume 1 (1967), pp. 111–125
P. Tomter, The spherical Bernstein problem in even dimensions and related problems, Acta Mathematica, volume 158 (1987), pp. 189–212
S.S. Chern, Brief survey of minimal submanifolds, Tagungsbericht (1969), Mathematisches Forschungsinstitut Oberwolfach
S.S. Chern, Differential geometry, its past and its future, Actes du Congrès international des mathématiciens (Nice, 1970), volume 1, pp. 41–53, Gauthier-Villars, (1971)
W.Y. Hsiang, W.T. Hsiang, P. Tomter, On the existence of minimal hyperspheres in compact symmetric spaces, Annales Scientifiques de l'École Normale Supérieure, volume 21 (1988), pp. 287–305

Mathematical problems
Unsolved problems in geometry
Differential geometry